NA-129 Lahore-XIII is a constituency for the National Assembly of Pakistan.

Election 2002 

General elections were held on 10 Oct 2002. Farid Ahmad Paracha of Muttahida Majlis-e-Amal won by 30,326 votes.

Election 2008 

General elections were held on 18 Feb 2008. Mian Marghoob Ahmad of PML-N won by 72,227 votes.

Election 2013 

General elections were held on 11 May 2013. Mehar Ishtiaq Ahmad of PML-N won by 114,474 votes and became the  member of National Assembly.

Election 2018 

General elections were held on 25 July 2018.

By-election 2023 
A by-election will be held on 16 March 2023 due to the resignation of Hammad Azhar, the previous MNA from this seat.

See also
NA-128 Lahore-XII
NA-130 Lahore-XIV

References

External links 
 Election result's official website

NA-121